Leporinus parvulus is a species of Leporinus found in the Rio Tapajós in Brazil in South America. This species can reach a length of  SL.

References

Taxa named by José Luis Olivan Birindelli
Taxa named by Heraldo Antonio Britski
Taxa named by Flávio César Thadeo de Lima
Taxa described in 2013
Fish described in 2013
Anostomidae